Svetvinčenat ( Chakavian: Savičenta, or Savicjenta) is a village and municipality in the south of the central part of Istria, Croatia, about 16 km north of Vodnjan; elevation 250 m.

Description 
Svetvinčenat was first mentioned ca. 965 C.E., when the town began to grow around a Benedictine abbey. The town is dominated by Grimani Castle which has two round towers and a living quarters. The castle's current form dates from 1589 when the Venetian Marino Grimani renovated and bought it. The castle was burnt down in 1945 and abandoned until the 1990s. It was extensively renovated between 2017 and 2020.

The town also has a number of churches, the oldest dating form the 13th century.

Villages
The municipality has 22 villages:

Gallery

References

External links

Svetvinčenat homepage 
Overall tourist offer of Svetvinčenat

Municipalities of Croatia
Populated places in Istria County